
Year 124 BC was a year of the pre-Julian Roman calendar. At the time it was known as the Year of the Consulship of Longinus and Calvinus (or, less frequently, year 630 Ab urbe condita) and the Fifth Year of Yuanshuo. The denomination 124 BC for this year has been used since the early medieval period, when the Anno Domini calendar era became the prevalent method in Europe for naming years.

Events 
 By place 
 Roman Republic 
 Fregellae's revolt against Rome begins in Latium. Later the city is captured and destroyed by the Romans.

 Parthia 
 Mithridates II succeeds Artabanus II as King of Parthia.

 Egypt 
 Cleopatra II of Egypt and her brother Ptolemy VIII of Egypt reconcile.

 China 
 Spring: The Han general Wei Qing, with an army of 30,000 cavalry, proceeds from Gaoque into Xiongnu territory, and in a night attack surrounds the Tuqi King of the Right in his camp. The Tuqi escapes, but numerous petty chiefs are captured in this and a second engagement.
 Li Xi and Zhang Cigong invade Xiongnu territory from Youbeiping Prefecture but encounter no enemy forces.
 Emperor Wu of Han rewards Wei Qing by making him General-in-Chief.
 Autumn: The Xiongnu retaliate by invading the Prefecture of Dai, where they kill its chief commandant, Zhu Ying.

Deaths 
 Artabanus II of Parthia

References